Brokenshire may refer to:

 Brokenshire College, Davao City, Philippines
 Brokenshire (surname), a surname from Cornwall, England. (Includes list of people of this name.)